North Kelsey railway station was a railway station serving both the village of North Kelsey and town of Caistor in Lincolnshire, England, it was opened in 1848 and closed in 1965.

References

External links
 North Kelsey station on navigable 1947 O. S. map
 

Disused railway stations in Lincolnshire
Railway stations in Great Britain opened in 1848
Railway stations in Great Britain closed in 1965
Former Great Central Railway stations
1848 establishments in England
1965 disestablishments in England